Alexander Fraser (August 24, 1824 – October 23, 1883) was an Ontario businessman and political figure. He represented Northumberland West in the Legislative Assembly of Ontario from 1867 to 1871.

He was born in Inverness, Scotland in 1824 and was educated at the King's College, University of Aberdeen. He was a woollen manufacturer. He was also a director of the Cobourg, Peterborough and Marmora Railway.

External links 

The Canadian parliamentary companion and annual register, 1871, HJ Morgan

1824 births
1883 deaths
Alumni of the University of Aberdeen
Ontario Liberal Party MPPs
People from Inverness
Scottish emigrants to pre-Confederation Ontario